Curanipe (in mapudungun: "plum tree that grows in the rock") is a town and seat of the municipality of Pelluhue, Province of Cauquenes, in VII Maule Region of Chile.

A popular and charming coastal resort, Curanipe used to be a well-known and secluded hangout for the Cauquenes elite and a proud regional "minor port", during the mid- and late 19th century. The town has a quaint architectural style that echoes the colonial rural architecture of Chile.

The Curanipe parish church of Santo Toribio, is a beautifully preserved religious building overlooking the town.

On 27 February 2010 at 06:34:14 GMT (03:34:14 AM local time), a magnitude 8.8 earthquake struck the seafloor 7 miles (11 km) southwest of Curanipe.

References

Communes of Chile
Ports and harbours of Chile
Populated places in Cauquenes Province
Coasts of Maule Region
Beaches of Chile